Reptilisocia impetigo is a species of moth of the family Tortricidae. It is found in Papua New Guinea.

The wingspan is about 18 mm. The ground colour of the forewings is whitish postbasally and at the base dorsally, with grey-brown strigulae. The wing is suffused green in the costal half postmedially and mixed grey at the apex and in the dorso-posterior fourth of the wing where it is also spotted brown-grey. The markings are weak, greenish and found only in the costal half of the wing. The hindwings are pale brownish.

Etymology
The species name refers to coloration of the forewings and is derived from Latin  (meaning a lichen).

References

Moths described in 2012
Tortricini
Moths of Papua New Guinea
Taxa named by Józef Razowski